Anti-folk (sometimes referred to as unfolk) is a music genre that emerged in the 1980s in response to the remnants of the 1960s folk music scene. Anti-folk music was made to mock the perceived self-seriousness of the time's mainstream music scene, and artists have the intention to protest with their mocking and clever lyrics.

History

In the United States
Anti-folk was introduced by artists who were unable to obtain gigs at established folk venues in Greenwich Village such as Folk City and The Speakeasy. In the mid-1980s, singer-songwriter Lach started The Fort, an after-hours club on NYC's Rivington Street in the Lower East Side. The Fort's opening coincided with the New York Folk Festival. Because of this, Lach dubbed his event the New York Antifolk Festival. Other early proponents of the movement included The Washington Squares, Cindy Lee Berryhill, Brenda Kahn, Paleface, Beck, Hamell on Trial, Michelle Shocked, Zane Campbell, John S. Hall, Roger Manning, Kirk Kelly, and Block.

The original Fort was shut down in 1985 by the police, and because of this the club moved locations several times, including East Village bars Sophie's and Chameleon, before settling in the back room of the SideWalk Cafe starting in 1993. The New York Antifolk Festival was held annually at the SideWalk Cafe until its closure in 2019 (long outlasting the original Folk Festival). Events have also taken place in the band shells in Tompkins Square Park and Central Park. While living in San Francisco in the early 1990s, Lach helped establish a West Coast anti-folk movement at the Sacred Grounds Coffee House.

Other artists to have achieved a notable level of success who have been considered anti-folk include Jeffrey Lewis, Regina Spektor and The Moldy Peaches.

In the United Kingdom

In the 2000s the term was adopted in Britain, particularly in the London underground scene, with acts including David Cronenberg's Wife and The Bobby McGee's. The UK anti-folk scene, largely centred in London and Brighton, has established its own identity, which has been written about in a six-page feature in the September 2007 issue of Plan B magazine. In 2004 the lo-fi musician Filthy Pedro started seasonal anti-folk festivals, which he promoted with Tom Mayne of the band David Cronenberg's Wife. An anti-folk scene in Brighton, curated primarily by Mertle, was quick to follow that of London.

Other key figures within the UK anti-folk community include Dan Treacy of Television Personalities, Jack Hayter, Milk Kan, Extradition Order, Benjamin Shaw, Lucy Joplin, Candythief, JJ Crash, Larry Pickleman and Paul Hawkins. Emmy the Great and Laura Marling were added to the roster of antifolk artists as they play antifolk music with mocking lyrics. Kate Nash started her music career playing anti-folk-style shows, including a concert promoted by Larry Pickleman and Mertle in Brighton.

Dan Willson, who performs under the name Withered Hand, is an Edinburgh-based musician often considered part of the genre. His first studio album, Good News, was released in 2009.

Welsh anti-folk artist Mr Duke has gained some popularity in Wales, and Crywank, an anti-folk project from Manchester, surfaced in 2009. Crywank's popularity can be seen through the disappointment of fans when the break-up was announced in 2019. Though in 2021, Crywank released a final album.

See also
 Anticomp Folkilation
 Psychedelic folk
 Counterculture of the 1960s

References

External links
 
 Antifolk.com The most updated Antifolk website, covering the movement across the world
 Antifolk.net The New York Antifolk website, started by Lach to promote the scene
 Morning Star article on Anti-folk
 Time Out London feature on Anti-folk
 Village Voice article on UK Anti-folk
 musicomh.com's Review of Anti-folk night at Sŵn Fest, Cardiff 2007
 Washington Post article about Zane Campbell's part in Anti-folk

American styles of music
Punk rock genres
1980s in music
1990s in music
2000s in music
2010s in music